Armenian Mesopotamia was a region in Northern Mesopotamia that was inhabited partly by Armenians. Tigranes the Great seized Northern Mesopotamia, and from 401 BC,  to 387 AD was part of Kingdom of Armenia. Later it was ruled by the Sassanid Empire, the Caliphates, the Buyids, the County of Edessa, the Timurids, Kara Koyunlu, Ak Koyunlu, and the Safavids. Then, following the 1639 Treaty of Zuhab, it became part of the Ottoman Caliphate (although briefly taken by Nader Shah of the Afsharid dynasty) and Turkey. Its Armenian population remained until the Armenian genocide of WWI.

See also
List of regions of old Armenia

References 

Geographic history of Armenia
Kingdom of Armenia (antiquity)